Southern Railway or Southern Railroad may refer to:

Argentina
 Buenos Aires Great Southern Railway, Argentina
 Southern Fuegian Railway, Tierra del Fuego, Argentina

Australia
 Main Southern railway line, New South Wales, Australia
 Southern railway line, Queensland, Australia

Austria
 Austrian Southern Railway
 Southern Railway (Austria)

Canada
 Canada Southern Railway, part of the New York Central Railroad
 Canadian Pacific Railway
 New Brunswick Southern Railway, part of the Canadian Pacific Railway
 Quebec Southern Railway
 Southern Manitoba Railway
 Southern Prairie Railway, a tourist railway in Ogema, Saskatchewan
 Southern Railway of British Columbia

India
 Southern Mahratta Railway, a railway company in British India founded in 1882
 Southern Punjab Railway, India
 Southern Railway zone, India

United Kingdom
 Southern (Govia Thameslink Railway)
 Southern Railway (UK), 1923–47

United States
 Alabama Great Southern Railroad
 Alton and Southern Railway, Illinois
 Arkansas Southern Railroad, part of the Chicago, Rock Island and Pacific Railway
 Atchison, Topeka and Santa Fe Railway
 Atlantic Coast Line Railroad
 California Southern Railroad
 Chicago and North Western Transportation Company
 Columbus and Greenville Railway
 Dakota Southern Railway, South Dakota
 Georgia Southern Railroad
 Illinois Central Railroad
 Illinois Southern Railway, part of the Missouri Pacific Railroad
 Indiana Southern Railroad
 Iowa Southern Railroad, part of the Wabash Railway
 Kansas Southern Railway, part of the Atchison, Topeka and Santa Fe Railway
 Louisiana Southern Railway, part of the Missouri Pacific Railroad
 Minnesota Southern Railway, part of the Chicago, Milwaukee, St. Paul and Pacific Railroad
 Missouri Pacific Railroad, part of the Missouri Pacific Railroad
 Montana Southern Railway
 New Jersey Southern Railroad, and New Jersey Southern Railway
 Norfolk and Western Railway, Virginia
 Norfolk Southern Railway, Virginia
 Richmond, Fredericksburg and Potomac Railroad, Virginia
 South Side Railroad of Long Island, part of the Long Island Rail Road, New York
 Southern Alabama Railroad
 Southern California Railway
 Southern Railroad of New Jersey
 Southern Railway – Carolina Division
 Southern Railway (U.S.), now part of the Norfolk Southern Railway
 Tennessee Southern Railroad, part of the Illinois Central Railroad
 Vermont Southern Railroad, part of the Boston and Maine Railroad
 Virginia Southern Railroad

Elsewhere
 Midi Railway, France
 PeruRail, Peru
 Railway to Beersheba, Israel
 Southern Railway (Turkey)
 Southern Railway (Württemberg), Germany
 Southern Railways (Ukraine)
 Southern Xinjiang railway, China

See also
 Great Southern Railway (disambiguation)
 Ohio Southern Railroad (disambiguation)
 Southern Railway Depot (disambiguation)
 Austrian Southern Railway Company